Raymond Biaussat (21 January 1932 – 13 May 2021) was a French painter.

Awards and honors
 Lauréat du Prix de peinture de Baden-Baden, 1954.
 Bourse des arts et lettres de la Fondation L'Avenir du Périgord, de Sylvain Floirat, 1966.
 Médaille du Professeur Grassé, 1966.
 Premier grand prix avec trophée d'or, Festival international de Cannes, 1974.
 Prix du public, Salon de Colombes, 1978.
 Prix international du Gemmail, Tours, 1982.
 Grand Consul de la Vinée de Bergerac, 1982.
 Membre titulaire de la Société historique et archéologique du Périgord, 1982.
 Diplôme « Ami de lumière », Biennale d'art sacré de Lourdes, 1982.
 Médaille Jean-Cocteau, Milly-la-Forêt, 1984.
 Chevalier de l'Ordre des Arts et des Lettres, 1984.
 Prix du conseil municipal de Périgueux, 1986.
 Médaille d'argent de la ville de Paris, 1992.
 Prix du jury du Salon de la Société nationale des beaux-arts, 2010.

References

1932 births
2021 deaths
20th-century French painters
École du Louvre alumni
People from Dordogne
Chevaliers of the Ordre des Arts et des Lettres
21st-century French painters